Acupalpus elegans is an insect-eating ground beetle in the genus Acupalpus.

elegans
Beetles described in 1829